Idris Olawale Gbaja-Biamila (born 5 August 1987), known as Ola The Comedian or simply Ola, is a Nigerian British stand-up comedian, writer and actor based in England.

Early life
Ola was born in 1987.

Career
His first gig was for the Aston University African-Caribbean Society in 2006. The next year he released 21, a self-published comedy DVD.

Ola has appeared on Plebs and 8 Out of 10 Cats, and was a finalist on ITV4's Search for A Stand Up Hero. He has written for The Now Show, The News Quiz and Nathan Caton’s Can’t Tell Me Nothing.

Personal life

Ola is a devout Christian, and works Christian themes into his stand-up.

References

External links
 Official site

English male comedians
English people of Nigerian descent
English people of Yoruba descent
Living people
1987 births